Ruth Arion (17 June 1912 – 15 November 1988) was a German-Israeli painter and enamel artist and one of the founders of Ein Hod Artists’ Village. Her works reflect her experiences as she moved from place to place in the Land of Israel from the 1930s through the 1990s.

Biography 
Arion was born as Evelina Grüntal in Breslau, Germany (now Wrocław, Poland). Her father, Leo Grüntal, was a fashion designer and owned a fashion store in the city. In 1931, she began to study art and medicine at the University of Breslau.
In 1933, after the Nazis came to power in Germany, Grüntal emigrated to Mandatory Palestine. Aged 22, she initially settled in Haifa, studying with the ceramicist Hedwig Grossman and the sculptor Rudi Lehman. She later joined Kibbutz Gesher, and subsequently lived in Kibbutz Mishmar HaEmek, Haifa and Jerusalem. Between 1938 and 1948, she completed her art studies at Bezalel Academy of Art and Design in Jerusalem, where she studied with Ludwig Johannes, Jacob Steinhardt and Mordecai Ardon. She also studied in Jerusalem with the painter Edward Matuszczak.

In the late 1940s, she settled in Jaffa, studying drawing with Marcel Janco. Influenced by Janco's conviction that art must be combined with craftwork, Arion began to study enamel Vitreous enamel and was the first artist in Israel to produce abstract enamel works. Her enamel works decorated educational institutions throughout the country.

Arion was married to the journalist and art lover Moshe Dagan (1909-1973) until his death.

In 1958, Arion joined a group of artists headed by Marcel Janco that established Ein Hod Artists’ Village, where she lived until her death. In 1960, she participated in specialist training in industrial work with enamel at the Gustavsberg factory in Sweden. In 1970, the Israeli Ministry of Education chose Arion as a guest artist at the Cité internationale des arts in Paris, where she studied calligraphy and Korean sumi painting with the Korean artist Ung Nu Li.

During the course of her career, Arion held numerous solo exhibitions in Israel and several in other countries. She died in Ein Hod in 1998, aged 86.

Solo exhibitions 

 1946 - Yunnes Gallery, Jerusalem
 1950 – Katz Gallery, Tel Aviv
 1960– Chemerinski Art Gallery, Tel Aviv
 1963 – Woodstock Gallery, London – oils and enamels
 1964 – Rodin Gallery, Cape Town
 1969 – 1969 – Saga Molin Gallery, Hallagarden, Sweden, watercolors
 1970 – Nora Art Gallery, Jerusalem
 1971 – Old Jaffa Gallery, jaffa
 1973 – Rotschild House, Haifa - Enemels
 1974 – Cité Internationale des Arts Paris 
 1981 – Municipal Museum of Ramat Gan – multi media exhibition
 1987 – Villa Clementine, Wiesbaden – multi media exhibition
 1988 – Waldersdort Gallery, Trier
 1991 – Artists House, Tel Aviv
 1996 – Janco Dada Museum
 1999 – Ein Hod artists Gallery

Group exhibitions

 1954 – Jerusalem Artists House
 1958 - Artists House, Haifa
 1962 – Tel Aviv Museum of Art
 1975 – Israeli Artists in Frankfurt
 1976 – International Exhibition, San Diego
 1978 – Bienale enamel, Limoges
 1978 – Trienale enamel, Tokyo

References

Notes

Sources
Ruth Arion: Works of Art & Life, Kedar, Dorit (editor); Auerbach Irene(English editor), Sabinsky, 1996,

External links 
 Ruth Arion at the Information Center for Israeli Art
 Ruth Arion, Ein Hod artists' village website

Jewish women painters
Jewish painters
1912 births
1998 deaths
20th-century Israeli painters
German emigrants to Mandatory Palestine